Bliss is a six-episode British comedy-drama television series set in Bristol. It was created by David Cross and was broadcast by Sky One in 2018. It stars Stephen Mangan as Andrew, a fraudulent travel writer, who is struggling to maintain long-term relationships with two partners, Kim (Heather Graham) and their teenage daughter (Hannah Millward) and Denise (Jo Hartley) and their teenage son (Spike White), who are not aware of one another.

References

External links
 

2018 British television series debuts
2018 British television series endings
2010s British comedy-drama television series
Adultery in television
English-language television shows
Sky UK original programming
Television series about families
Television shows set in Bristol